Langlidalen ("the long hillside valley") is a valley in Nathorst Land at Spitsbergen, Svalbard. It has a length of about three kilometers, and is located between the mountains of Rånekampen at the western side, and Langlifjellet and Sven Nilssonfjellet at the western side. The glacier of Langlibreen extends from Steindolptoppen into the upper part of Langlidalen.

References

Valleys of Spitsbergen